Holy Sepulchre Cemetery and Mausoleum is an American Roman Catholic cemetery in Totowa, New Jersey, named after the Church of the Holy Sepulchre in Jerusalem, thus associated with the Resurrection of Jesus.

The cemetery was founded as the parish cemetery of the Cathedral of St. John the Baptist in Paterson. It has been in operation since the early 1840s, incorporating some of the original cemeteries in Paterson.

The cemetery holds the plot for the remains for the Franciscan friars of Holy Name Province, which serves the Eastern Seaboard of the United States.

Notable burials
 Dan Duva (1951–1996), boxing promoter
 Lou Duva (1922–2017), boxing trainer and manager
 John Philip Holland (1841–1914), Irish engineer and submarine designer
 Mychal F. Judge, O.F.M. (1933–2001), the first official victim of the September 11, 2001 attacks
 Matthew Maguire (1850–1917), labor activist
 Edward Sylvester "The Only" Nolan (1857–1913), Major League Baseball player
 Dave Prater (1935–1988), R&B musician
 Alexander M. Quinn (1866–1906), US Army soldier who received the Medal of Honor for his actions in the Spanish–American War
 Robert A. Roe (1924–2014), US Congressman
 John "Honey" Russell (1902–1973), basketball player and coach
 A Commonwealth war grave, of a Canadian Army soldier of World War I

References

External links
 
 
  

Roman Catholic cemeteries in New Jersey
1840s establishments in New Jersey
Roman Catholic Archdiocese of Newark
Cemeteries in Passaic County, New Jersey
Burials at Holy Sepulchre Cemetery (Totowa, New Jersey)